Robert Etheridge (born 8 October 1991), better known by his stage name Dimension, is an English DJ, record producer, songwriter, musician and engineer from London. He has been releasing records since 2012, and on 5 March 2021, he released his debut album Organ. He has previously collaborated with other producers, including Sub Focus, Culture Shock, Cyantific, and Wilkinson.

Music career

After releasing his first single Delight in 2012, Dimension quickly made a name for himself within the drum & bass scene, and in 2014 was signed by Chase & Status to their label MTA Records. In 2018 he mixed the 98th edition of the Fabric Live album and released the single Desire with Sub Focus which rose to number 51 in the UK Singles Chart and is a certified Gold record in the UK.

In March 2021 he released his debut album Organ. The album debuted at Number One on the UK Official Dance Chart.

Discography

Albums

Singles

References

1991 births
Living people
DJs from London
English record producers
English songwriters
English audio engineers
English drum and bass musicians
English dance musicians